Celso Esquivel González (born 20 March 1981) is a Paraguayan footballer who is currently playing for Club Almagro of the Primera B Metropolitana in Argentina..

Club career

Esquivel played in Argentina for San Lorenzo, Racing Club and Talleres. In his native country he did exclusively for Sportivo Luqueño.

International career
Esquivel was a member of the Paraguayan squad at the 2001 FIFA World Youth Championship and was part of the silver medal-winning Paraguayan 2004 Olympic football team. On 4 August, before the Summer Olympics began, he played in a preparation game against the Portugal of Cristiano Ronaldo in the city of Algarve, resulting in a 5–0 defeat.

Honours
Paraguay U23
 Olympic Games:  in Athens (2004)

References

External links
 Celso Esquivel at Football Lineups
 
 
  

1981 births
Living people
Paraguayan footballers
Paraguay under-20 international footballers
Paraguay international footballers
Paraguayan expatriate footballers
San Lorenzo de Almagro footballers
Racing Club de Avellaneda footballers
Argentine Primera División players
Expatriate footballers in Argentina
Olympic footballers of Paraguay
Olympic silver medalists for Paraguay
Footballers at the 2004 Summer Olympics
Sportivo Luqueño players
Talleres de Córdoba footballers
2004 Copa América players
Olympic medalists in football
Medalists at the 2004 Summer Olympics
Association football defenders